The Great Western Railway (GWR) was incorporated by Act of Parliament in 1835 and nationalised on 1 January 1948. During this time it amalgamated with, or purchased outright, many other railway companies. These are listed here in two groups. The early amalgamations (mostly between 1843 and 1900) often involved railway companies that were already being financially supported by the GWR. The Railways Act 1921 brought many new companies into the fold including many successful Welsh lines.

List Key
(date) – the date on which the company was amalgamated into, or purchased by, the GWR.
♠ – Companies that were already operated by or leased to the GWR or one of the other absorbed railways before amalgamation. Note: This list is incomplete.
‡ – Companies operating wholly or partly on the  broad gauge at the time that they combined with the GWR. The broad gauge was finally abandoned on 21 May 1892.

Early amalgamations and purchases
 Cheltenham and Great Western Union Railway (1 July 1843) ♠ ‡
 Oxford and Rugby Railway (14 May 1846) ♠ ‡
 Berks and Hants Railway (14 July 1846) ♠ ‡
 Monmouth and Hereford Railway (1846)
 Wilts, Somerset and Weymouth Railway (14 March 1850) ♠ ‡
 Shrewsbury and Birmingham Railway (1 September 1854)
 Shrewsbury and Chester Railway (1 September 1854)
 Birkenhead Railway  (1 January 1860)
 Chester and Birkenhead Railway
 Birkenhead, Lancashire and Cheshire Junction Railway
 South Wales Railway (1 January 1862) ♠ ‡
 West Midland Railway (1 August 1863)
 Newport, Abergavenny and Hereford Railway
 Oxford, Worcester and Wolverhampton Railway
 Worcester and Hereford Railway
 Severn Valley Railway
 Vale of Neath Railway (1 February 1865) ‡
 Aberdare Valley Railway
 Wycombe Railway (31 January 1867) ♠
 Bristol and South Wales Union Railway (1 August 1868) ♠ ‡
 Tenbury and Bewdley Railway (12 July 1869)
 Stourbridge Railway (1 February 1870)
 Great Western and Brentford Railway (1 July 1871) ♠
 Wallingford and Watlington Railway (2 December 1871)
 Wrexham and Minera Railway (1871)
 Llanelly Railway (1 January 1873)
 Llynvi and Ogmore Railway (1 July 1873)
 Llynvi Valley Railway
 Ogmore Valley Railway
 Gloucester and Dean Forest Railway (30 June 1874) ♠
 East Somerset Railway (2 December 1874) ♠
 Bristol and Exeter Railway (1 January 1876) ‡
 South Devon Railway (1 February 1876) ‡
 Dartmouth and Torbay Railway
 Launceston and South Devon Railway
 Moretonhampstead and South Devon Railway
 South Devon and Tavistock Railway
 West Cornwall Railway (1 February 1876) ‡
 Hayle Railway
 Wellington and Drayton Railway (30 August 1877) ♠
 Monmouthshire Railway (1 August 1880) ♠
 Culm Valley Light Railway (5 August 1880) ♠
 Malmesbury Railway (6 August 1880) ♠
 Carmarthen and Cardigan Railway (1 July 1882)
 Berks and Hants Extension Railway (10 August 1882) ♠
 Torbay and Brixham Railway (1 January 1883) ♥
 Festiniog and Blaenau Railway (10 September 1883)
 Stratford-upon-Avon Railway (1 July 1883) ♠
 Watlington and Princes Risborough Railway (1 January 1884)
 Whitland and Cardigan Railway (1 September 1886)
 Faringdon Railway (1 July 1886)
 Worcester, Bromyard and Leominster Railway (1 July 1888)
 Cornwall Railway (1 July 1889) ‡
 Calne Railway (1 July 1892) ♠
 Newent Railway (1 July 1892)
 Ross and Ledbury Railway (1 July 1892)
 Wellington and Severn Junction Railway (1 July 1892)
 Cornwall Minerals Railway (1 July 1896) ♠
 Lostwithiel and Fowey Railway
 Newquay and Cornwall Junction Railway
 Newquay Railway
 Par Tramway
 Pembroke and Tenby Railway (1 July 1896)
 Corwen and Bala Railway (7 August 1896)
 Llangollen and Corwen Railway (7 August 1896)
 Marlborough Railway (7 August 1896)
 Milford Railway (7 August 1896)
 Vale of Llangollen Railway (7 August 1896)
 Wenlock Railway (7 August 1896)
 Banbury and Cheltenham Direct Railway (1 July 1897)
 Buckfastleigh, Totnes and South Devon Railway (1 July 1897)
 Kington and Eardisley Railway (1 July 1897)
 Nantwich and Market Drayton Railway (1 July 1897) ♠
 Minehead Railway (6 August 1897) ♠
 North Pembrokeshire and Fishguard Railway (1 July 1898)
 Maenclochog Railway
 North Pembrokeshire and Fishguard Railway
 Helston Railway (2 August 1898) ♠
 Leominster and Kington Railway (2 August 1898)
 Staines and West Drayton Railway (1 July 1900) ♠
 Golden Valley Railway (Pontrilas to Hay Junction) (1 May 1901) ♠
 Bridport Railway (26 July 1901) ♠
 Devon and Somerset Railway (26 July 1901) ♠
 Ely Valley Railway (South Wales) (11 August 1903)
 Wye Valley Railway (4 August 1905)
 Lambourn Valley Railway (1 July 1906)
 Manchester and Milford Railway (1 July 1907)
 Bala and Festiniog Railway (26 July 1910)

1921 Railways Act
The Railways Act 1921 provided for the compulsory amalgamation of many of Britain's railways. 27 of the larger railways (termed "Constituent Companies" by the Act) would amalgamate on or before 1 January 1923 to create four larger railways (termed "Amalgamated Companies"). About 100 of the smaller railways (termed "Subsidiary Companies") would be absorbed by either the Constituent Companies or the Amalgamated Companies. In what was termed the "Western Group", the Constituent Companies were:
 Alexandra (Newport and South Wales) Docks and Railway  miles (17 km)
 Barry Railway 68 miles (109 km)
 Cambrian Railways  miles (472 km)
 Cardiff Railway  miles (19 km)
 Great Western Railway
 Rhymney Railway 51 miles (82 km)
 Taff Vale Railway  miles (199 km)
The newly amalgamated company continued to use the name Great Western Railway, and its new board of directors included representatives from all seven of the constituent companies. There was no board representation for the Subsidiary Companies, which were:
 Brecon and Merthyr Railway (1 July 1922)  miles (97 km)
 Burry Port and Gwendraeth Valley Railway (1 July 1922) 21 miles (34 km)
 Cleobury, Mortimer and Ditton Priors Railway (1 January 1922) 12 miles (19 km)
 Didcot, Newbury and Southampton Railway (1923)  miles (68 km) ♠
 Exeter Railway  miles (14 km) ♠
 Forest of Dean Central Railway 5 miles (8 km) ♠
 Gwendraeth Valley Railways (1 January 1923) 3 miles (5 km) ♠
 Lampeter, Aberayron and New Quay Light Railway 12 miles (19 km) ♠
 Liskeard and Looe Railway 9 miles (14 km) ♠
 Llanelly and Mynydd Mawr Railway (1 January 1923) 13 miles (21 km)
 Mawddwy Light Railway ♠
 Midland and South Western Junction Railway (1 July 1923)  miles (101 km)
 Neath and Brecon Railway (1 July 1922)
 Penarth Extension Railway  miles (3 km) ♠
 Penarth Harbour, Dock and Railway  miles (16 km) ♠
 Port Talbot Railway (1 January 1922) 35 miles (56 km)
 Princetown Railway (1922)  miles (17 km)
 Rhondda and Swansea Bay Railway (1 January 1922) 29 miles (46 km) ♠
 Ross and Monmouth Railway  miles (20 km) ♠
 South Wales Mineral Railway 13 miles (21 km) ♠
 Teign Valley Railway  miles (12 km) ♠
 Vale of Glamorgan Railway  miles (33 km) ♠
 Van Railway ♠
 Welshpool and Llanfair Light Railway ♠
 West Somerset Railway (1922)  miles (23 km) ♠
 Wrexham and Ellesmere Railway ♠
After the grouping, two organisations voluntarily sold their operations and locomotives to the GWR. Both of these worked the railways of Swansea Docks:
 Swansea Harbour Trust (1 July 1923)
 Powlesland and Mason (contractors at Swansea Docks) (1 January 1924)

References

See also
 History of rail transport in Great Britain
 List of early British railway companies

Pre-grouping British railway companies
 
Constituents of the Great Western railway